WKAZ (680 kHz) is a business news formatted broadcast radio station licensed to Charleston, West Virginia, serving Charleston and Kanawha County, West Virginia. WKAZ is owned and operated by WVRC Media.

History
Originally WCAW was the top-rated "top 40" station in the market during most of the early 1960s. Its main competition within the format at that time was WGKV and WKAZ. The primary ratings battle was between WCAW and WCHS.

It changed to a country format shortly after that and stayed with it from the 60's thru the 90's.  Over its tenure as a country station, some of its DJ personalities included Randy Damron, Rick Johnson (later worked for WVAF), and "Smilin'" Dewey Calwell.

WCAW was bought by The West Virginia Radio Corporation in 1993, along with WVAF. At various times broadcasting country and American standards formats, the station was formerly a gospel station until sister station WKAZ-FM became Jack FM in 2006, at which point the oldies format was moved to WKAZ AM, and the station tag became "68-KAZ" to differentiate it from its 107.3 FM sister.

As an oldies station, they concentrated on 50's, 60's, 70's, and limited 80's music.  They would also broadcast Arkansas Governor Mike Huckabee's syndicated podcast The Huckabee Report three times each weekday.

In addition to its primary AM frequency, WKAZ-AM simulcasts on 95.3 FM (not to be confused with its aforementioned sister station WKAZ-FM, which does not share the Oldies format and broadcasts on 107.3 FM).

The format of WKAZ changed from oldies to business news in March 2017, with programming from the Bloomberg Radio network.

References

External links

 

KAZ
All-news radio stations in the United States